The 2021–22 Slovenian First League (known as the Liga NLB for sponsorship reasons) was the 31st season of the Slovenian First League, the top men's handball league in Slovenia. A total of fourteen teams contested this season's league, which began on 10 September 2021 and concluded on 27 May 2022.

Celje won their twenty-fifth title.

Teams

Krka and Izola were relegated in the previous season. Šmartno and SVIŠ were promoted from the second division.

Arenas and locations
The following 14 clubs competed in the Slovenian First League during the 2021–22 season:

League table

Top goalscorers

References

External links
Slovenian Handball Federaration 

Slovenia
Hanbdall
Handball
Handball competitions in Slovenia